Curwen's Bay Barb ( 1690 -  1728) was a foundation sire of the Thoroughbred breed. A bay horse with a white blaze, he was imported by Henry Curwen in 1698 from France. He had originally been a present to Louis XIV from the King of Morocco. One of his early sons, Mixbury, stood just over 13 hands high and apparently "there were not more that two horses of his day that could beat him under light wrights". He also sired Tantivy, Brocklesby, Brocklesby Betty, Creeping Molly and the top stallion Hip. It has also been suggested that he may have been the sire of Alcock's Arabian.

His sire line is extinct, but he made a significant contribution to the Thoroughbred breed. The three traditional foundation sires whose sire lines still exist today were Darley Arabian, Godolphin Arabian and Byerley Turk. However Curwen's Bay Barb contributed significantly to the breed through other lines of descent. Modern Thoroughbred's tend to have most crosses to Godolphin Arabian (contributing 13.8%), then Darley Arabian (6.5%), Curwen's Bay Barb (4.2%) and Byerley Turk (3.3%).

Sire line tree

Curwen's Bay Barb
Hip
Windsor
Mixbury Galloway
Monkey
Alcock's Arabian
Tipler
Crab
Grey Ward
Crab (Routh)
Valiant
Rib
Sober John
Sloe
Sweeper
Bustard
Dorimond
Gamahoe
Othello (Portmore)
Allworthy
Locust
Oroonoko
Brunswick
Spectator
Pagan
Sulfur
Mark Anthony
Vandal
Brilliant
Antelope
Crab (Cumberland)
Milksop
Crab (Shepherd)
Lath (Protector)
Othello (Kingston)
True Briton
Selim
Gentleman
Why Not

References

 Foundation Sires of the Thoroughbred: Curwen's Bay Barb tbheritage.com. Retrieved 2012-08-29
 

Individual Arabian and part-Arabian horses
1720s racehorse deaths
Arabian racehorses
Individual male horses